Mappia is a genus of shrubs in the family Icacinaceae. There are eleven species (including Nothapodytes Blume) occurring in Central America, the West Indies and Asia. The type species for the genus is Mappia racemosa Jacquin. Some research has been showed that it has an effective anti cancer property against breast cancer .

Leretia cordata has been included in Mappia by some authors. The name "Mappia" has been used for Cunila and for Doliocarpus guianensis (synonym: Soramia guianensis). Both of these uses of the name "Mappia" are nomina rejecta.

References 

 
Taxonomy articles created by Polbot
Asterid genera